White Face (also known as Edgar Wallace's White Face the Fiend) is a 1932 British crime film directed by T. Hayes Hunter and starring Hugh Williams, Gordon Harker and Renee Gadd. The film is based on a play by Edgar Wallace.

Plot
A doctor becomes a blackmailer and a jewel thief in order to raise funds for a hospital in East London but is uncovered by an ambitious reporter.

Cast
 Hugh Williams - Michael Seeley
 Gordon Harker - Sam Hackett
 Norman McKinnel - Inspector Mason
 Renee Gadd - Janice Harman
 Richard Bird - Donald Bateman
 Nora Swinburne - Inez Landor
 Leslie Perrins - Louis Landor
 J.H. Roberts - Doctor Marford
 D. A. Clarke-Smith - Dr. Rudd
 Gibb McLaughlin - Sgt. Elk
 Jeanne Stuart - Gloria Gaye
 Clare Greet - Mrs. Albert

Preservation status
The film is now considered a lost film, but the screenplay still exists. While working on this film, an affair between Hugh Williams and Renee Gadd began.

Critical reception
The New York Times wrote, "the British studios contribute a well-bred little mystery picture to the Broadway market in White Face, which is at the Broadway Theatre. An Edgar Wallace product, tailor-made according to the formula for these matters, it places a corpse in a slummy London street at midnight, sets the hounds of Scotland Yard baying up several wrong trees, and in good time whips the mask off the mysterious White Face. On Hollywood standards it is a pleasant enough item for the homicide enthusiasts, suffering generally from a faintly anemic quality and specifically from an absence of humor."

References

Bibliography
 Sweet, Matthew. Shepperton Babylon: The Lost Worlds of British Cinema (Faber and Faber, 2005)

External links

1932 films
1932 crime films
Films based on works by Edgar Wallace
Films directed by T. Hayes Hunter
Lost British films
Gainsborough Pictures films
Films set in London
British crime films
British black-and-white films
1932 lost films
1930s English-language films
1930s British films